The men's C-1 1000 metres event was an open-style, individual canoeing event conducted as part of the Canoeing at the 1968 Summer Olympics program. Heat times were given in tenths of a second (0.1) while the semifinal and final events were given in hundredths of a second (0.01) in the official report.

Medallists

Results

Heats
Twelve competitors were entered, but eleven took part. Held on October 22, the top three in each heat move on to final with the others relegated to the semifinal.

In the official report, Emanuelsson's first name is listed as Sten.

Semifinal
Only the five canoeists who did not advance from the first round competed in the semifinal. Taking place on October 24, the top three finishers advanced to the final.

Final
The final took place on October 25.

Tatai qualified as a reserve for the Hungarian team, but won decisively after driving the other finalists to exhaustion.

References
1968 Summer Olympics official report Volume 3, Part 2. p. 616. 
Sports-reference.com 1968 C-1 1000 m results.
Wallechinsky, David and Jaime Loucky (2008). "Canoeing: Men's Canadian Singles 1000 Meters". In The Complete Book of the Olympics: 2008 Edition. London: Aurum Press Limited. p. 480.

Men's C-1 1000
Men's events at the 1968 Summer Olympics